Route 165 is a 68 km north–south highway on the south shore of the Saint Lawrence River in Quebec, Canada. Its southern terminus is in Black Lake, now part of Thetford Mines, at the junction of Route 112 and its northern terminus is in Saint-Louis-de-Blandford at the junction of Autoroute 20. The stretch between Plessisville and Black Lake used to be Route 265 but it was re-numbered Route 165 in the 1990s.

Municipalities along Route 165
 Thetford Mines (Black Lake)
 Irlande
 Saint-Ferdinand
 Saint-Pierre-Baptiste
 Sainte-Sophie-d'Halifax
 Plessisville
 Plessisville (parish)
 Princeville
 Saint-Louis-de-Blandford

See also
 List of Quebec provincial highways

References

External links  
 Interactive Provincial Route Map (Transports Québec) 
 Route 165 on Google Maps

165